OP9 cells are a cell line derived from mouse bone marrow stromal cells (mesenchyme). These cells are now characterized as stem cells.

When co-culture with embryonic stem cells (ESC), OP9 cells can induce ESC to differentiate into blood cells.

See also
Mouse Embryonic Fibroblasts (MEF)

References

External links
Cellosaurus entry for OP9

Rodent cell lines